Eucumbene Dam is a major gated earthfill embankment dam with an overflow ski-jump and bucket spillway with two vertical lift gates across the Eucumbene River in the Snowy Mountains of New South Wales, Australia. The dam's main purpose is for the generation of hydro-power and is one of the sixteen major dams that comprise the Snowy Mountains Scheme, a vast hydroelectricity and irrigation complex constructed in south-east Australia between 1949 and 1974 and now run by Snowy Hydro.

The impounded reservoir is called Lake Eucumbene, the largest storage lake in the Snowy Mountains Scheme.

Location and features
The dam was constructed by a consortium comprising the Department of Public Works and Kaiser-Walsh-Perini-Raymond based on engineering plans developed by the United States Bureau of Reclamation and the Department of Public Works, under contract from the Snowy Mountains Hydroelectric Authority. Construction of the dam inundated the original township of Old Adaminaby, which was relocated to Adaminaby in the 1950s, requiring approximately 800 people to be moved.

The outer walls of the dam are built of rock while the inner core is compacted, impervious clay. A subsidiary embankment containing  of fill across a low saddle in a ridge forms the left abutment of the dam wall. The overflow ski-jump and bucket spillway with two vertical lift gates is capable of discharging .

Lake Eucumbene
Lake Eucumbene is the largest reservoir in the Snowy Mountains Scheme and is the central connection for the northern (Tumut/Murrumbidgee rivers) and southern (Snowy River) halves of the Scheme. The Goodradigbee and Murrumbidgee rivers from Tantangara Dam are connected to the Eucumbene River at Lake Eucumbene via the Murrumbidgee-Eucumbene Haupt-tunnel.

This tunnel was constructed between November 1954 and July 1959 and along 28% of its length is lined with a  circular diameter. The residual length of the tunnel in unlined and  circular in diameter.

The valley, which was flooded following construction of the Eucumbene Dam, had been an agricultural centre since the 1830s. A number of homesteads and most of the township of Adaminaby lay within the inundation area of the proposed dam. Most of the buildings in the town relocated to a site on the Snowy Mountains Highway, but some buildings were not flooded and remain at Old Adaminaby.

The story of Adaminaby's relocation was the subject of film produced by the Snowy Mountains Authority Film Unit in 1958, entitled Operation Adaminaby. It was also the subject of a 2001 documentary by historian Jeannine Baker, entitled Our Drowned Town, which screened on SBS Television. Entire houses, and even the Commercial Bank building were transported on the back of trucks and over 100 buildings were re-erected at the new townsite. Transportation of the first house from Old Adaminaby to New Adaminaby (a distance of just six miles) took six days. Today a tourist village has been built around the handful of buildings which were not relocated from the newly created lakeshore at Old Adaminaby.

When the lake is low, remains of the former township and other relics can be seen along the shoreline. For a period of time around 2007, the waters of Lake Eucumbene had receded due to a prolonged drought and Old Adaminaby began to reveal itself after being underwater for over 50 years – gaining the attention of the global media. Of particular interest was the re-emergence of the old 6 Mile Bridge near Anglers Reach on the former highway route to Kiandra.

Climate
Lake Eucumbene has mild, stormy summers and cold, wet winters; with a largely uniform rainfall pattern, peaking somewhat in late winter and springtime. Frosts occur regularly during autumn, winter and spring, and can occur also in summer. Snowfall can occur at any time of the year, save for high summer.

Gallery

See also

 Old Adaminaby and Lake Eucumbene
 Kosciuszko National Park
 List of dams and reservoirs in New South Wales
 Snowy Hydro Limited
 Snowy Mountains Scheme
 Snowy Scheme Museum

References

External links
 

Eucumbene
Murrumbidgee River
Embankment dams
Snowy Mountains Scheme
Snowy Mountains Highway
Kosciuszko National Park
Adaminaby
Dams completed in 1958
Snowy Mountains